1626 Sadeya, prov. designation: , is a stony Phocaea asteroid and binary system from the inner regions of the asteroid belt, approximately  in diameter. It was discovered on 10 January 1927, by Catalan astronomer Josep Comas i Solà at Fabra Observatory in Barcelona, Spain, and named after the Spanish and American Astronomical Society. The discovery of a companion was announced on 1 December 2020.

Orbit and classification 

The stony S-type asteroid is a member of the Phocaea family, a group of asteroids with rather high inclinations between 18° and 32°. It orbits the Sun in the inner main-belt at a distance of 1.7–3.0 AU once every 3 years and 8 months (1,327 days; semi-major axis of 2.36 AU). Its orbit has an eccentricity of 0.27 and an inclination of 25° with respect to the ecliptic. Sadeyas observation arc begins 2 months after its official discovery with a precovery taken at Yerkes Observatory.

Naming 

This minor planet was named after the Spanish and American Astronomical Society, also known by its acronym "S.A.D.E.Y.A.". It was founded by Comas i Solà, who also was its first president. The official  was published by the Minor Planet Center on 30 January 1964.

Physical characteristics

Rotation period 

Sadeya has a well-defined rotation period between 3.414 and 3.438 hours with a change in brightness between 0.07 and 0.22 in magnitude. These numerous rotational lightcurves were obtained by ESO astronomers, Julian Oey, Pierre Antonini, Ramon Naves, Enric Forné, Hilari Pallares, Brian Warner and Vladimir Benishek between 1996 and 2014.

Diameter and albedo 

According to the surveys carried out by the Japanese Akari satellite and NASA's Wide-field Infrared Survey Explorer with its subsequent NEOWISE mission, Sadeya measures between 14.25 and 15.14 kilometers in diameter, and its surface has an albedo between 0.30 and 0.512. The Collaborative Asteroid Lightcurve Link assumes a lower albedo of 0.23 – derived from 25 Phocaea, the namesake of the Phocaea family – and calculates a diameter of 15.95 kilometers with an absolute magnitude of 11.2.

Satellite 
On 1 December 2020, the discovery of a satellite in orbit of Sadeya was announced by Vladimir Benishek, Petr Pravec, and several other collaborators.

References

External links 
 (1626) Sadeya is a binary asteroid, CBET #4893
 Lightcurve plot of 1626 Sadeya, Palmer Divide Observatory, B. D. Warner (2009)
 Asteroid Lightcurve Database (LCDB), query form (info )
 Dictionary of Minor Planet Names, Google books
 Asteroids and comets rotation curves, CdR – Geneva Observatory, Raoul Behrend
 Discovery Circumstances: Numbered Minor Planets (1)-(5000) – Minor Planet Center
 
 

001626
Discoveries by Josep Comas Solà
Named minor planets
001626
19270110